Kasempa Town is a developing small town located in North-Western Province, Zambia. Kasempa Town  is located on the western bank of the Lufupa River as it flows south into the Kafue National Park.

Population

Landmarks
The landmarks within the town limits or close to the edges of the town include:

 Mukinge Mission Hospital is a major hospital for the mission SIM and the Evangelical Church in Zambia (ECZ).
 Kasempa Clinic 
 Kasempa Radio Mast
 Kasempa Central Market
 The Junction Between Mumbwa-Kankwenda Highway (D181) and the Kaoma-Kasempa Highway (D301).
 Kasempa Day Secondary School
 Kasempa Primary & Basic School
 Kasempa Boys Boarding School
 Mukinge Girls Secondary School
 Mukinge Day Secondary School
 Mukinge Airport

References

Populated places in North-Western Province, Zambia